Gaspar  Vega is a Belizean politician. He was a Deputy Prime Minister of Belize from 2008 to 2016. He held the office as Minister of Natural Resources and the Environment in Belize (2008-2012). Currently he is the Minister of Natural Resources and Agriculture..

Biography 
He is also the area representative for the Orange Walk North constituency. Vega is originally from San Estevan Village, Orange Walk District. As a child, Gapi, as he is known by family and friends, got his first introduction to work on the family farm. Later, he attended and graduated from Muffles College in Orange Walk Town. After spending much of his adult career working in the insurance business, in 1988, Gasper founded Vega’s Imports Ltd. – a merchandising import-distribution company. After several years, Vega’s Imports Ltd evolved into a well established and very successful family business.
 
Gaspar entered the political arena in 2006. In 2008 he was elected to represent the people of the Orange Walk North constituency.

Land theft before retirement
In March 2016, Following a land scandal that involved his son, Vega announced he would stand down immediately from the post of deputy party leader of the UDP and would not run for another term. Vega has since been scandalized over various land schemes which came to light shortly after he resigned which to many seems quite suspicious. His family has since been accused of forging the signature of a signee regarding the documents through which his son Andre Vega attained a compensation of $400,000 BZD. When asked, she stated that she had never met Vega nor that she signed any document at all and that it was forged. The documents were examined where it was then confirmed that it was in fact forged. The signee decided to take legal action against the Vega family and demanded that the Prime Minister of Belize revoke the land which she did not sign for. His son Andre Vega was previously asked to return the $400,000 in full which he has not done yet.

In 2019, the chief magistrate ruled that Andre Vega is to return $400,000.00 within a time period or face imprisonment.

Demonstration against corruption
After Vega had been exposed with proper evidence the leader of the opposition John briceño organized a demonstration against corruption and the demand that Vega be investigated at once. Being just planned within 3 days over four thousand residents showed up. Holding up posters of Vega in Handcuffs and others demanding that his son return $400,000 wrongly compensated money. They marched until arriving at the Central Park in the Orangewalk Town. Gaspar Vega organized a counter protest and did not have the permit to do so, it was strongly condemned for illegal and dangerous, he still did so anyway. Less than 200 people showed up in front of his home to represent him and the military of Belize separated both political parties and the NGOs by blocking the road and being on guard since the protest began near his residence.

After speeches at the Central Park John briceño led the residents to the a nearby bridge linking Belize City to Orangewalk in order to block it, in hopes of pressuring the Prime minister into initiating the investigation into Vega and his family.

The government did just the opposite, they sent troops, the military and heavy buses of police force to move them by force which in turn caused civilians to be tear gassed multiple times and beaten with batons. The media was assaulted unlawfully by the police, one being a female journalist which was tackled and man handled . It was then found out that the officials were acting under direct command of the Government who was supporting Vega and denying and stalling on starting his investigation. Non of the civilians were violent. Not all the civilians made it to the Bridge since the police stopped some of the buses heading to the destination full of protesters.

On that day Vega declared publicly that he would return into the political arena.

References

1957 births
Living people
People from Orange Walk District
United Democratic Party (Belize) politicians
Deputy Prime Ministers of Belize
Government ministers of Belize
Members of the Belize House of Representatives for Orange Walk North